Krishna Sarthak is a Kannada filmmaker and producer. He entered into movies business at 21 years as executive producer for the Kannada film Dyavre even before completing his engineering. He started his own film production company Krishna Creations and produced Dayavittu Gamanisi(2017) starring Vasishta N. Simha, Prakash Belawadi, Raghu Mukherjee it was nominated for the Filmfare Award for Best Film – Kannada at the 65th Filmfare Awards South. Premier Padmini starring Jaggesh, Madhoo, Sudharani, Pramod, Vivek Simha, Hitha Chandrashekar in the lead roles got released in April 2019

Filmography

References

External links
 

Living people
Film producers from Bangalore
1991 births